Lloyd George "Bomber" Gross (September 5, 1905 — December 11, 1990) was a professional ice hockey player who played 52 games in the National Hockey League. He played for the Toronto Maple Leafs, Boston Bruins, Detroit Red Wings, and New York Americans between 1927 and 1935. The rest of his career, which lasted from 1925 to 1942, was spent in various minor leagues. He was born in Berlin, Ontario.

Career statistics

Regular season and playoffs

External links

1905 births
1990 deaths
Boston Bruins players
Boston Cubs players
Buffalo Bisons (AHL) players
Buffalo Bisons (IHL) players
Canadian ice hockey left wingers
Cleveland Falcons players
Detroit Olympics (IHL) players
Detroit Red Wings players
Ice hockey people from Ontario
New York Americans players
Niagara Falls Cataracts players
Ontario Hockey Association Senior A League (1890–1979) players
St. Paul Saints (AHA) players
Sportspeople from Kitchener, Ontario
Toronto Maple Leafs players
Toronto Ravinas players
Tulsa Oilers (AHA) players
Canadian expatriate ice hockey players in the United States